Triplophysa yunnanensis is a species of ray-finned fish in the genus Triplophysa. It is a cave-dwelling species endemic to Yunnan, China. It grows to  SL.

References

Y
Cave fish
Freshwater fish of China
Endemic fauna of Yunnan
Taxa named by Yang Jun-Xing
Fish described in 1990